Goad maps a.k.a. Goad plans or Goad atlases incorporate detailed street maps including individual buildings and their uses.

The maps are named for Charles E. Goad who first produced such things for Fire Insurance companies.

Charles Goad was a Civil Engineer who practised in Toronto, London, Ontario, and elsewhere. His major business was the creation of detailed street maps for the inner areas of industrial cities, often as a client of insurance companies. He also produced other larger-area maps e.g. for Ontario.

See Also
 fire insurance maps of England

References

External links

 Bell.net
 "Fire Insurance Plans" article by Gwyn Rowley
"The Goad Collection" The largest collection of UK and international Goad maps and fire plans
 Goad links at Experian
 Google Images: Search results for "Goad Map"

Other sources
 Rowley, Gwyn, (1984) British fire insurance plans. Goad
 Rowley, Gwyn and Shepherd, Peter, (1976) 'A source of elementary, spatial data for town centre research in Britain'. Area8 3, 201–208.
 A catalogue of fire insurance plans published by Chas E. Goad 1878–1970. Part A 'British Isles'. Part B 'Foreign'. Goad, 1984.

Atlases
Map companies